Marlyn may refer to:

Marlyn Glen (born 1951), Scottish Labour Party politician
Marlyn Maldonado (born 1985), Guatemalan badminton player
John Marlyn (1912–2005), Austro-Hungarian-born Canadian writer
Marlyn Mason (born 1940), American actress, producer, and screenwriter
Marlyn Meltzer (1922–2008), one of the six original programmers of ENIAC
Marc Marlyn Trestman (born 1956), American football and Canadian football coach
Marlyn Williams (born 1993), South African professional rugby union player

See also
Lonaigbank and Marlyn, pair of buildings in Luss, Argyll and Bute, Scotland